Friedrich Wilhelm Löcherer (born 9 February 1938), known professionally as Fred Williams, is a German actor. He appeared in more than forty films from 1962 to 1992. 1977 came his most well-known international role as Captain Gräbner, the commander of the reconnaissance battle group of 9th SS Panzer Division Hohenstaufen in Richard Attenborough's film A Bridge Too Far.

Filmography

References

Bibliography

External links
 

1938 births
Living people
Male actors from Munich
German male film actors
German male television actors
20th-century German male actors